Euvrilletta mucorea is a species of beetle in the family Ptinidae. It is found in North America.

Subspecies
These two subspecies belong to the species Euvrilletta mucorea:
 Euvrilletta mucorea mucorea (LeConte, 1865)
 Euvrilletta mucorea variabilis (White, 1973)

References

Further reading

 
 

Euvrilletta
Articles created by Qbugbot
Beetles described in 1865